Shin Doo-sun (born 9 May 1976) is a South Korean cross-country skier. He competed at the 1998 Winter Olympics and the 2002 Winter Olympics.

References

1976 births
Living people
South Korean male cross-country skiers
Olympic cross-country skiers of South Korea
Cross-country skiers at the 1998 Winter Olympics
Cross-country skiers at the 2002 Winter Olympics
Asian Games medalists in cross-country skiing
Cross-country skiers at the 1996 Asian Winter Games
Cross-country skiers at the 1999 Asian Winter Games
Cross-country skiers at the 2003 Asian Winter Games
Cross-country skiers at the 2007 Asian Winter Games
Medalists at the 1999 Asian Winter Games
Asian Games bronze medalists for South Korea
20th-century South Korean people